Soused is a collaborative album between singer Scott Walker and experimental metal band Sunn O))). Announced in early 2014 by 4AD, the album was produced by Walker and Peter Walsh with the help of Mark Warman and released on October 21, 2014. It is the last album Walker released during his lifetime, barring soundtrack work. 4AD released a music video for the song "Brando", directed by French filmmaker Gisèle Vienne.

Production and recording
Sunn O))) songwriters Stephen O'Malley and Greg Anderson had previously contacted Walker about contributing vocals to Monoliths & Dimensions in 2009, but Walker declined due to prior engagements. While developing material for his follow up record to 2012's Bish Bosch, Walker reached out to the band. Walker's decision to incorporate drones came about while developing lyrics. As the singer-composer stated, "I could get those gaps, you see, between phrases. Which I usually fill with silence, but now I had the drones."

Upon agreeing to collaborate, Walker sent O'Malley and Anderson a series of wordless demos of tracks he produced, alongside Peter Walsh, made entirely with synthesizers. With the synthesizers, Walker directly outlined the instrumental accompaniments that O'Malley and Anderson were to provide via guitar drones. To record Sunn O)))'s guitar drones, the band brought its entire stage equipment, a large collection of amplifiers, to Walker's London studio space.

Walker initially wanted to name the album Ronronner, French for "purr", "like the noise a big cat would make"; but O'Malley, who lives in France, believed that French audiences would read it as "too cute". Walker then came up with Soused, with the intended meaning of being submerged in water.

Reception

Track listing
The physical packaging of the vinyl and the digital listings on various streaming services use the track names "Brando" and "Fetish", but the lyrics in the liner notes include alternative titles "Brando (Dwellers on the Bluff)" and "Fetish (Flip'n'Zip)".

CD and digital editions
"Brando (Dwellers on the bluff)" – 8:42
"Bull" – 9:21
"Herod 2014" – 11:59
"Fetish (Flip'n'Zip)" – 9:08
"Lullaby" – 9:22

Vinyl LP edition
Side one
"Brando (Dwellers on the bluff)"  – 8:42
"Bull"  – 9:21

Side two
"Herod 2014"  – 11:59

Side three
"Fetish (Flip'n'Zip)"  – 9:08
"Lullaby"  – 9:22

Personnel

Greg Anderson – guitars, percussion guitar on "Bull", lead guitar on "Lullaby"
Tos Nieuwenhuizen – lead guitar (except for "Bull"); moog on "Brando", "Bull", and "Lullaby"; riff guitar on "Fetish"
Stephen O'Malley – guitars, bass guitar on "Brando" and "Fetish", feedback guitar on "Bull" and "Fetish", lead guitar on "Bull" and "Herod 2014", percussion guitar on "Bull", re-amped hi synth on "Lullaby", sleeve design, type
Scott Walker – vocals, production, composer, drum programming on "Lullaby", mixing

Additional personnel
Dot Allison – backing vocals on "Bull"
Frank Arkwright – mastering
Guy Barker – trumpet (except "Herod 2014")
G'ast Bouschet – cover photo, photography
Andy Findon – saxophone on "Herod 2014"
Peter Gamble – bull whips on "Brando"
Phil Laslett – photography
Liam Nolan – assistant
Simon Saywood – analog technical support
Ian Thomas – drums (except "Herod 2014")
Peter Walsh – co-production, recording, mixing, electronic sound treatment, audio manipulation keyboards fx (except "Lullaby"), drum programming (except "Fetish"), mastering
Sam Walsh – backing vocals on "Bull"
Mark Warman – electronic sound treatment, audio manipulation, keyboards, drum programming on "Brando" and "Herod 2014", shaker on "Fetish", musical direction, orchestration

Credits adapted from AllMusic.

References

2014 albums
4AD albums
Albums produced by Peter Walsh
Albums produced by Scott Walker (singer)
Collaborative albums
Scott Walker (singer) albums
Sunn O))) albums